The 2009–10 Sam Houston State Bearkats men's basketball team represented Sam Houston State University in the 2009–10 college basketball season. This was head coach Bob Marlin's twelfth season at Sam Houston State. The Bearkats competed in the Southland Conference and played their home games at Bernard Johnson Coliseum. They finished the season 25–8, 14–2 in Southland play to capture the regular season championship. They also were champions of the 2010 Southland Conference men's basketball tournament to earn the conferences automatic bid to the 2010 NCAA Division I men's basketball tournament. They earned a 14 seed in the South Region and were defeated by 3 seed and AP #19 Baylor in the first round.

Roster
Source

Schedule and results
Source
All times are Central

|-
!colspan=9| Regular Season

|-
!colspan=9| 2010 Southland Conference men's basketball tournament

|-
!colspan=10| 2010 NCAA Division I men's basketball tournament

References

Sam Houston State Bearkats
Sam Houston State
Sam Houston Bearkats men's basketball seasons
San Antonio
San Antonio